Sir Roderick Howard Carnegie AC (born 27 November 1932) is a prominent Australian businessman, primarily working in the coal industry.

Carnegie was born in November 1932 in Melbourne, eldest child and only son of Douglas and Margaret Carnegie (née Allen). He was educated at Geelong Grammar, Trinity College at the University of Melbourne (B.Sc. 1954), Oxford (M.A. and Dip. Ag. Ec. 1957) and Harvard (M.B.A. 1959). In the late 1950s he was President of the Oxford University Boat Club.

In 1958 he became a consultant with McKinsey & Company Inc. in the United States, in 1963 he founded the Australian practice of McKinsey in Melbourne, and in 1967 he returned to New York to become a Director of the Company. He subsequently joined CRA Limited (now Rio Tinto) as Finance Director in 1972, served as Managing Director from 1974 to 1986, and as Chairman.

Since1986, he has served as a director of several companies, including the Australian Advisory Board of General Motors, CSIRO, Business Council of Australia, Group of Thirty and was Chairman of the Advisory Committee on Relations with Japan. 

He was awarded a knighthood, as a Knight Bachelor in the 1978 Queen's Birthday Honours list In recognition of service to industry, and in the 2003 Queen's Birthday Honours list he was awarded Companion of the Order of Australia In recognition of service to the promotion of innovative leadership and to the development of competitive practices in business, both national and international, and to the community, particularly in the health and arts fields. He was awarded a Centenary Medal for service to Australian society in resource development and management.

His current business activities include Chairman, Pacific Edge Group.

He is a Fellow of Trinity College, Melbourne, and serves as Patron of the Australian Centre for Blood Diseases.

Honours and awards

Publications

References and notes 

1932 births
Living people
Companions of the Order of Australia
Australian Knights Bachelor
Alumni of the University of Oxford
Harvard Business School alumni
People educated at Geelong Grammar School
Businesspeople from Melbourne
University of Melbourne alumni
People educated at Trinity College (University of Melbourne)
Fellows of the Australian Academy of Technological Sciences and Engineering
McKinsey & Company people